The Solomon Islands Labour Party is a political party in Solomon Islands. The party was founded in 1988 by the Solomon Islands Council of Trade Unions after the leadership of the union split. Joses Tuhanuku, went on to lead the Labour Party, while  Bartholomew Ulufa'alu formed the Solomon Islands Liberal Party.

The party participated in government 1993–1994 and then in the Solomon Islands Alliance for Change government 1997–2000.

At the legislative elections, December 5, 2001, the party won 1 out of 50 seats. The only MP was Joses Tuhanuku, elected from the Rennell and Bellona constituency. At the last legislative elections on 5 April 2006, the party won no seats.

References

Labour parties
Political parties in the Solomon Islands
Political parties established in 1988
1988 establishments in the Solomon Islands